In folk music a tune-family is, "a seeming multiplicity of melodies," reducible, "to a small number of 'models' or sets." One can think of the models or sets as deep structures. Often, "different tunes are the same," and, "the same tune is different."

Idiolectical (individual) or dialectical (based on context or on locale) variations may exist. Different families may also arise from the use of stock structures or of formulae such as stock phrases and motifs.

See also
 Modal frame 
 Matrix (music) 
 Tune (folk music)

References

Further reading
 Middleton, Richard (1990/2002). Studying Popular Music. Philadelphia: Open University Press. .
 Van der Merwe, P. (1989). Origins of Popular Style. Oxford.
 Burke (1978).
 Hatch and Millward (1987).
James R. Cowdery. A Fresh Look at the Concept of Tune Family. Ethnomusicology. Vol. 28, No. 3 (Sep., 1984) (pp. 495-504)

Folk music
Musicology
Melody